Calliostoma katsunakamai is a species of sea snail, a marine gastropod mollusk in the family Calliostomatidae.

Some authors place this taxon in the subgenus Calliostoma (Kombologion).

Description

Distribution
This species occurs in the Indian Ocean and in the Pacific Ocean off Japan and Sumatra

References

 Kosuge, S., 1998. Descriptions of two new species of the genus Calliostoma (Gastropoda, Trochidae) from Indonesia and Indian Ocean. Bulletin of the Institute of Malacology, Tokyo 3(5):72-74, pl. 23.

External links
 

katsunakamai
Gastropods described in 1998
Molluscs of the Pacific Ocean